The Autonomous Provincial Concentration (in Spanish: Concentración Provincial Autónoma, CPA) was a Panamanian small regionalist conservative political party.

The party was active in Colón Province in the 1930s and 1940s. 
The CPA was represented in the Panamian Parliament from 1940 to 1945.

Pedro Fernández Parrilla was the founder and leader of the PCU.

References

Defunct political parties in Panama
Political parties with year of disestablishment missing
Political parties with year of establishment missing